Ryptsjerk is a village in Tytsjerksteradiel municipality in the province of Friesland, the Netherlands. It had a population of around 767 in January 2017.

There is a restored windmill, the Ypey Mole.

History 
The village was first mentioned in 1314 as Ripikerka, and means church belonging to Rijp (short for Hurdegaryp). Ryptsjerk developed after the Zwarteweg from Leeuwarden to Vijversburg was built between 1528 and 1531. The Dutch Reformed church was built in 1757.

Ryptsjerk was home to 331 people in 1840. The polder mill Ypey Mole was built in 1858 near Vijversburg. Between 1980 and 1981, it was moved and restored to its current location where it is draining excess water from the Koekoekspetten.

Gallery

References

Populated places in Friesland
Tytsjerksteradiel